The Colonial Athletic Association baseball tournament, sometimes referred to simply as the CAA Tournament, is the conference baseball championship of the NCAA Division I Colonial Athletic Association.  The top six finishers in the regular season of the conference's nine baseball teams advance to the double-elimination tournament, which was played in 2022 at Walter C. Latham Park on the campus of Elon University in Elon, North Carolina.  The winner of the tournament receives an automatic berth to the NCAA Division I Baseball Championship.

Format
The first CAA Tournament in 1986 was a four team double-elimination tournament, with the bottom three finishers not participating.  From 1987 through 1993, all six teams participated in a double-elimination tournament.  After Old Dominion joined the league in 1992, the last place team did not participate in tournament.  The CAA adopted a seven team format in 1994, with the top seed getting a bye and playing the winner of the opening round game between the four and five seeds.  This format was used until VCU joined the conference in 1996 and the league adopted a traditional 8 team double-elimination tournament.  After the conference shakeup prior to the 2002 season, the league split into divisions and brought six teams to the tournament.  The two division champions were automatically in the field as the top two seeds, and the top four remaining finishers were seeded three through six.  This format lasted only two years, as  discontinued baseball and the league dropped to nine teams and eliminated divisions.  The six team format survived through the 2009 season, and the league used a four team format for 2010 and 2011.  The six team format was adopted again in 2012 and maintained through 2019.  In the aftermath of the cancellation of the 2020 event due to the COVID-19 pandemic, the CAA decided to include all 9 teams in the tournament in 2021, with the bottom two seeds participating in a play-in game before the traditional double-elimination tournament.

Champions

By year
The following is a list of conference champions and sites listed by year.

By school
The following is a list of conference champions listed by school.

Italics indicate that the program is no longer a CAA member, as of the upcoming 2023 season.

References